The 2019 AFL Women's All-Australian team represents the best-performed players of the 2019 AFL Women's season. It was announced on 2 April 2019 as a complete women's Australian rules football team of 21 players. The team is honorary and does not play any games.

Initial squad
The initial 40-woman All-Australian squad was announced on 21 March.  had the most players selected in the initial squad with nine, and every team had at least two representatives. Nine players from the 2018 team were among those selected.

Final team
The final team was announced on 2 April. Premiers Adelaide had the most selections with five, and every team except  had at least one representative. Four players from the 2018 team were selected, three of whom – Adelaide co-captain Chelsea Randall, 's Karen Paxman and  captain Emma Kearney – achieved selection for the third consecutive year. Adelaide's other co-captain, Erin Phillips, was announced as the All-Australian captain and Randall, the previous year's All-Australian captain, was announced as the vice-captain.

Note: the position of coach in the AFL Women's All-Australian team is traditionally awarded to the coach of the premiership-winning team.

References

External links
 AFLW Awards

2019 AFL Women's season